Milutin Ivković (3 March 1906 – 25 May 1943) was a Yugoslav medical doctor and football defender who played for Yugoslavia at the 1928 Summer Olympics and the 1930 FIFA World Cup.

After his playing career, he became a communist political activist. He was killed by Nazi Germany during World War II on 25 May 1943 in Jajinci (near the capital city Belgrade).

Early life
Ivković was born in Belgrade on 3 March 1906. His mother Milica was the granddaughter of the Serbian Vojvoda Radomir Putnik. It was during his childhood that he received his life-long nickname of Milutinac.

Playing career

Club career

He started playing football in the youth team of SK Jugoslavija, and became a regular senior player for the club between 1922 and 1929 playing a total of 235 matches. Towards the end of his career he moved to another Belgrade club, BASK.

International career
Ivković played for the Yugoslav national team a total of 39 times. He made his debut on 28 October 1925 against Czechoslovakia (0-7 defeat) in Prague, and his last match for the national team was played on 16 December 1934 against France (2-3 defeat) in Paris. He participated in the first 1930 FIFA World Cup in Montevideo.

Post-playing career
In 1934, he graduated from the University of Belgrade Faculty of Medicine and after completing his military service he opened office in Belgrade.

Ivković joined the Progressive Movement and was one of the leaders of the boycott of the Olympic Games in Berlin. In June 1938 he became the editor of Mladost, launched at the initiative of the Communist Youth League.

Death and legacy
During the occupation of Yugoslavia, he cooperated with the Yugoslav Partisans. He was persecuted and on several occasions arrested and prosecuted. On 24 May 1943 at 23:45 hours he was arrested and the next day at Jajinci he was shot and killed "for communist activities". His body was never found.

The Football Association of Serbia set up in 1951 a plaque in the JNA Stadium (Partizan Stadium) and a street next to the Red Star Stadium (former playground of SK Jugoslavija) bears his name. Additionally, a monument made by Vladimir Jokanović, was erected in the outskirts of the same stadium and was inaugurated on 16 May 2013.

References

External links

 Profile at Serbian federation official site 

1906 births
1943 deaths
Footballers from Belgrade
Yugoslav footballers
Serbian footballers
Yugoslavia international footballers
Olympic footballers of Yugoslavia
Footballers at the 1928 Summer Olympics
1930 FIFA World Cup players
Association football defenders
SK Jugoslavija players
FK BASK players
Yugoslav First League players
Serbian communists
Yugoslav Partisans members
Banjica concentration camp inmates
People executed by Nazi Germany by firearm
Resistance members killed by Nazi Germany
Serbian people executed in Nazi concentration camps
Yugoslav people executed in Nazi concentration camps